Callidula plagalis is a moth in the  family Callidulidae. It is found on Aru.

References

Callidulidae
Moths described in 1874